John Kane (born 8 June 1987) is a footballer who plays as a defender for Pollok.

Kane came through the youth system at Hibernian. He made his Scottish Premier League debut at the age of 16 against Livingston in April 2004, coming on as a late substitute for Kevin Thomson. Although a Scotland Under–18 international, this was to be his only first-team appearance for Hibs, and he joined Motherwell in the January 2005 transfer window.

After a spell at Partick Thistle, he briefly dropped to Junior level with Glenafton Athletic before signing for Stranraer in June 2007, under the management of former Motherwell team-mate Gerry Britton. A successful spell at the club saw him named player of the year two seasons running before leaving for the US and a year at Creighton University in Nebraska. Kane returned to Scotland with Stirling Albion in 2010 before rejoining Stranraer for a second spell.

Kane signed for Clyde in June 2012. He then joined Junior side Pollok.

External links

References

Living people
1987 births
Footballers from Glasgow
Scottish footballers
Hibernian F.C. players
Motherwell F.C. players
Partick Thistle F.C. players
Glenafton Athletic F.C. players
Stranraer F.C. players
Stirling Albion F.C. players
Clyde F.C. players
Scottish Football League players
Association football defenders
Scotland youth international footballers
Scottish Junior Football Association players
Expatriate soccer players in the United States
Pollok F.C. players